StrongDM is a company that provides a privileged access manager for aggregating secure access and permissions.

Company history

StrongDM was founded in 2015 by Elizabeth Zalman, Justin McCarthy, and Schuyler Brown. The company was one of the first female led startups backed by Hearst's initiative to invest in women led startups. The company received an early investment of $250,000 from HearstLabs.

In 2018 StrongDM released free open source software called Comply which, allows smaller organizations to implement SOC 2 from a developers perspective, in an open source environment. Any organization can download a pre-authored library of 24 policies, edit directly in markdown, track versions with Github, assign compliance tasks through Jira and monitor progress in a unified dashboard.

Elizabeth Zalman continued as CEO until 2021 when Tim Prendergast was appointed new CEO.

Software
StrongDM software is a privileged access manager for aggregating secure access and permissions. The platform logs and catalogs every user action which can be reviewed with a video replay.  It centralizes backend infrastructure access for legacy or multi-cloud environments. StrongDM also integrates with identity providers, secret stores, and SIEM tools.

StrongDM delivers infrastructure access that work with legacy, cloud, or hybrid environments.  The platform manages and audits access to servers and databases, providing a single platform to control access to databases for employees, vendors and cloud-based tools.

The company combines authentication, authorization, networking and observability into one platform that grants and mediates user access to enterprise backend infrastructure and logs user actions in video replay.

Competitors in the field are CyberArk, Delinea, BeyondTrust, Teleport and Perimeter 81.

Patents

On January 3, 2023, the company was granted two patents for:

 
In 2022, the company released a company survey of over 600 IT, devops and security professionals detailing how 53% of companies can take weeks to assign permissions and that over 65% of professionals are using shared logins for sensitive access.

Funding Rounds

As of Jan 7th, 2023 StrongDM has raised over $76,000,000 in venture funds from investors including Bloomberg Beta, Sequoia Capital, Tiger Global and Google Ventures. Billionaire investor and Sequoia Capital's Global Managing Partner, Douglas Leone, joined the board as part of the Sequoia Capital led $17M Series A financing round. As a female led Silicon Valley startup under former CEO Elizabeth Zalman, the company raised over $76M in venture capital.

References

Networking companies of the United States
Software companies based in California
Computer security software companies